"Gone Girl" is a song written by Jack Clement and originally recorded by Johnny Cash, giving its title to Cash's album Gone Girl that appeared in December 1978.

Cash recorded this song with producer Larry Butler on May 4, 1978, later returning to work on it on August 1. "'Gone Girl' was certainly worth the extra time, with a smooth melody that gives Cash the room to glide into the low notes, and a rhythm that is infectious," writes C. Eric Banister in his book Johnny Cash FAQ: All That's Left to Know About the Man in Black.

Released by Cash as a single (Columbia 3-10817, with "I'm Alright Now" on the opposite side) in September, the song only reached number 44 on U.S. Billboard country chart.

Track listing

Charts

References

External links 
 "Gone Girl" on the Johnny Cash official website

Johnny Cash songs
1978 songs
1978 singles
Songs written by Jack Clement
Columbia Records singles